Frankenthal (Pfalz) is a town in southwestern Germany, in the state of Rhineland-Palatinate.

History 
Frankenthal was first mentioned in 772. In 1119 an Augustinian monastery was built here, the ruins of which — known, after the founder, as the Erkenbertruine — still stand today in the town centre.

In the second half of the 16th century, people from Flanders, persecuted for their religious beliefs, settled in Frankenthal. They were industrious and artistic and brought economic prosperity to the town. Some of them were important carpet weavers, jewellers and artists whose Frankenthaler Malerschule ("Frankenthal school of painting") acquired some fame. In 1577 the settlement was raised to the status of a town by the Count Palatine Johann Casimir.

In 1600 Frankenthal was converted to a fortress. In 1621 it was besieged by the Spanish during the Thirty Years' War, and then successively occupied by troops of the opposing sides. Trade and industry were ruined and the town was not reconstructed until 1682.

In 1689 the town was burnt to the ground by French troops in the War of the Grand Alliance. The town did not fully recover from this for more than fifty years.

However, in 1750, under the rule of the Elector (Kurfürst) Charles Theodore, Frankenthal was established as a centre of industry. Numerous factories were opened and mulberry trees were planted for silk production. In 1755 the famous Frankenthal porcelain factory was opened, which remained in production until 1800. During this period, the town was also known in English as Frankendal.

In 1797 the town came under French occupation during the French Revolutionary Wars. It passed into the rule of Bavaria in 1816.

The beginning of modern industrialisation is dated from 1859.

In 1938 the Jewish synagogue, built in 1884, was burnt to the ground during the Kristallnacht.

In 1943 during a bombing raid the centre of the town was almost completely destroyed. In 1945, at the end of World War II, its industries in ruins, it was occupied first by the Americans and then by the French.

From 1946 Frankenthal has been part of the federal state of Rhineland-Palatinate. Today the town is again the site of some medium-sized industries.

Number of inhabitants
 1850:  4,767
 1900: 16,899
 2000: around 50,000
 2015: 48,363

Lord Mayors

Twin towns – sister cities

Frankenthal is twinned with:
 Colombes, France (1958)
 Rosolini, Italy (2018)
 Sopot, Poland (1991)
 Strausberg, Germany (1990)

Since 1982, Frankenthal also cooperates with the community of Butamwa in Nyarugenge, Rwanda.

Notable people

 Abraham Heidanus (1597–1678), a reformed theologian
 Esther Moscherosch née Ackermann (1602–1632), wife of the statesman and baroque poet Johann Michael Moscherosch
 Jacob Marrel (1614–1681), still life painter
 Johann Philipp Becker (1809–1886), revolutionary
 Georg Vierling (1820–1901), composer (dedication of the  Vierlingstrasse )
 Konrad Maurer (1823–1902), a Bavarian legal historian
 Julius von Michel (1843–1911), ophthalmologist
 Richard Reverdy (1851–1915), civil engineer
 Karl Wendling (1857–1918), pianist and music pedagogue
 Karl Perron (1858–1928), opera singer
 Franz Nissl (1860–1919), neurologist and psychiatrist
 August von Parseval (1861–1942), designer of airships (dedication of the Parsevalplatz)
 Hermann Wilker (1874–1941), rower
 Karl Gentner (1876–1922), operatic tenor
 Oskar Perron (1880–1975), mathematician
 Ludwig Marum (1882–1934), lawyer and politician, victims of the Holocaust
 Arnold Fanck (1889–1974), director and pioneer of the mountain film
 Paul Martini (1889–1964), medical doctor
 Carl Neubronner (1892–1961), politician
 Georg Gehring (1903–1943), wrestler
 Karl Huber (1904–1965), politician and trade unionist
 Josef Frank (1906–1971), politician (SPD)
 Werner Knab (1908–1945), jurist and SS leader
 Hans Carste (1909–1971), composer and conductor
 Adolf Metzner (1910–1978), Leichtathlet
 Rudi Fischer (1925–2012), Football goalkeeper
 Michael Werner (publisher) (born 1965), founder of the Pennsylvania German newspaper Hiwwe wie Driwwe 
 Tobias Eckmeier (born 1995), vlogger and Instagram personality known as EXSL95
 Frauke Schäfer, operatic soprano

Family name 

The family name "Frankenthal" is attested among people scattered in many countries - especially among Jews - and indicates an ultimate origin of the family in the town, though it might be centuries old and leaving no memory other than the name.

Gallery

References

Citations

Bibliography
 .
 
 

 
Anterior Palatinate
Palatinate (region)